The Hellenic Children's Museum in Athens, Greece is located in two houses specifically designed for use by children. The museum is also featured in the book, The Athens Assignment.

References

External links
Official site (in Greek) English version expected.
www.greece-museums.com
www.athensinfoguide.com

Museums in Athens
Children's museums
Museums established in 1987
1987 establishments in Greece
Child-related organizations in Greece